Cranbrook is a small town in the Shire of Cranbrook in the Great Southern region of Western Australia between Katanning, Kojonup and Mount Barker, situated 320 km south of Perth. It is billed as "The Gateway to the Stirlings", referring to the nearby Stirling Range National Park. At the 2006 census, Cranbrook had a population of 280.

The settlement grew after it was one of the original railway stations on the Great Southern Railway when the railway opened in 1889, and was gazetted a townsite in 1899.

The name is taken from the town of Cranbrook in Kent, England, about 65 kilometres south east of London. It is believed to have been named by Mr J A Wright, who was manager of the Western Australian Land Company which built the railway.

The town is a Cooperative Bulk Handling receival site.

References

External links

 Shire of Cranbrook

Towns in Western Australia
Grain receival points of Western Australia
Shire of Cranbrook